José C. Paz is a city, the capital of José C. Paz Partido, Buenos Aires Province, Argentina. It forms part of the Greater Buenos Aires urban area and is located around 35 km north-west of the Capital federal. It was named after José C. Paz (2 October 1842 – 10 March 1912), an Argentine journalist and diplomat.

External links

La Guía del Mundo
Aquí la Noticia

José C. Paz Partido
Populated places in Buenos Aires Province
Cities in Argentina
Argentina